Legislative and local elections were held in the Philippines on May 14, 2007. Positions contested included half the seats in the Senate, which are elected for six-year terms, and all the seats in the House of Representatives, who were elected for three-year terms. The duly elected legislators of the 2007 elections joined the elected senators of the 2004 elections to comprise the 14th Congress of the Philippines.

Most representatives won seats by being elected directly, the constituency being a geographical district of about 250,000 voters. There are 220 seats in total for all the legislative districts.

Some representatives were elected under a party-list system.  Only parties representing marginalized groups were allowed to run in the party-list election. To gain one seat, a party must win 2% of the vote.  No party-list party may have more than 3 seats.  After the election, in a controversial decision, the Commission on Elections (COMELEC) changed how it allocates the party-list seats.  Under the new formula only one party will have the maximum 3 seats. It based its decision on a formula contained in a Supreme Court decision.

Local elections for governor, vice governor, provincial board seats and mayoral, vice mayoral and city/municipal council seats in Metro Manila and the provinces are up for grabs as well.

Issues in the elections

Automated elections
Sen. Richard J. Gordon and his fellow Senators succeeded in passing Republic Act No. 9369 or the Amending the Election Modernization Act but it was too late since it was passed three months before the elections but since the law was passed, the elections for the Autonomous Region in Muslim Mindanao Regional Governor and Vice-Governor later in August 2008 it will be used for the test-run for computerization and the general elections in 2010 for the nationwide computerization of elections.

Failure of elections
The following areas held special elections after the COMELEC designated the following areas as failure of elections:

Candidates

TEAM Unity

Genuine Opposition

Other tickets

KBL

Independent

Election results

Senate

House of Representatives

Elections at congressional districts

Party-list election

Local elections
All local positions are disputed in the elections, with the candidate with the most votes for governor, vice-governor, mayor and vice-mayor being declared as the winner. Winners for the positions for board members and councilors depends on the size of the assembly.
Local tallies partial and unofficial complete (Archived)

See also
 14th Congress of the Philippines

References

External links
COMELEC – Official website of the Philippine Commission on Elections (COMELEC)
NAMFREL – Official website of National Movement for Free Elections (NAMFREL)
PPCRV – Official website of the Parish Pastoral Council for Responsible Voting (PPCRV)
VForce – 1 Million Volunteers for Clean Elections (VForce)

Media websites
Halalan 2007 – Election coverage by ABS-CBN
Eleksyon 2007 - Election coverage by GMA Network
Eleksyon 2007 – Election coverage by the Philippine Daily Inquirer

 
2007
2007 in the Philippines
2007 elections in Asia
2007 elections in the Philippines